Wingfield Township is a township in Geary County, Kansas, USA.  As of the 2000 census, its population was 139.

Geography
According to the USGS, it contains two cemeteries: Humboldt and Saint Joseph's.

The streams of East McDowell Creek, MacArthur Branch, Pressee Branch, Swede Creek, Thierer Branch and West McDowell Creek run through this township.

References
 USGS Geographic Names Information System (GNIS)

Further reading

External links
 City-Data.com

Townships in Geary County, Kansas
Townships in Kansas